Gary Campbell may refer to:

Gary Campbell (linebacker) (born 1952), former American football linebacker 
Gary Campbell (American football coach) (born 1951), running backs coach for the University of Oregon football team
Gary Campbell (graphic designer), Canadian graphic designer, art director, and publisher of Aggregation (magazine)
Gary Scott Campbell (born 1954), Canadian former WHA and NHL player
Gary Campbell, songwriter on 1980 album Bar Talk by John Scofield